Barry Devolin, (born March 10, 1963) is a former Member of Parliament in the House of Commons of Canada and an academic.

Early life and education
Devolin was born in Peterborough and grew up in Haliburton.  Devolin studied political science at Carleton University, where he graduated with a bachelor's degree in 1985. Two years later he received a master's degree in political science from the Stony Brook University on Long Island, New York.

In 1993, Devolin married Ursula Beachli. They have 2 children, George (2002) and Molly (2004). The Devolins live in Haliburton, Ontario.

Academic career
In February 2017, Devolin was named chair of the Asian Studies Graduate Program at Sejong University. His research focuses on the socialization challenges facing North Korean defectors, and the ongoing Korean conflict.

Devolin began his teaching career in 1986 while a graduate student at Stony Brook University. He was awarded the 2014 Distinguished Alumni Award by Stony Brook University's Political Science department.

Political career
In 2013, Barry Devolin announced he would not seek re-election in the 2015 federal election. His former executive assistant, Jamie Schmale, became the Conservative candidate for Haliburton-Kawartha Lakes-Brock, and was subsequently elected as a Member of Parliament in October 2015. Thus ended Devolin's 11-year career in the House of Commons, which included his service as Assistant Deputy Speaker, his last 7 years.

Prior to 2008, Devolin served on several Parliamentary Standing Committees, including as chair of the Standing Committee on Aboriginal Affairs and Northern Development (2006–08). Devolin was also active in various parliamentary associations, and chaired Canada-Korea, Canada-Azerbaijan and Canada-Belgium. In 2013, South Korean President Lee Myung-buk awarded the prestigious Order of Diplomatic Service Medal (Heung-in) to Devolin, the only Canadian to ever receive it.

In 2004 Devolin was nominated as the candidate for the new Conservative Party of Canada, and was elected in the 2004 election to represent the newly redistributed riding of Haliburton—Kawartha Lakes—Brock. He received 44% of the popular vote, defeating O'Reilly. In the 2006 election Devolin was re-elected with 49% of the vote. He was subsequently reelected in 2008 with 56% of the vote, and in 2011 with 60% of the vote.

Many years earlier, Devolin ran in the 1993 federal election as a member of the Reform Party in the riding of Victoria—Haliburton. Devolin placed second in the election, losing to John O'Reilly of the Liberals. Following the 1993 election, Devolin served as the director of research for the parliamentary caucus of the Reform Party. He spent time working in British Columbia and Korea, and in 1994 returned to Canada to assist Chris Hodgson to seek election to the Legislative Assembly of Ontario for Haliburton—Victoria—Brock. After this, he served as Hodgson's chief of staff. Devolin did not seek the nomination in Haliburton—Victoria—Brock in the 1997 and 2000 federal elections.

Over the years, Devolin held several senior political staff positions in the Canadian and Ontario governments, including chief of staff to Ontario Ministers Tim Hudak (1999–2000) and Chris Hodgson (1995–96), special assistant for education to Ontario Premier Mike Harris (1998–99), and director of research and question period strategist for the Reform Party of Canada under Preston Manning (1993–94). From 2000 to 2004, Devolin ran Shuter Street Associates, a strategic communications and planning consulting firm in Toronto.

Devolin served twice as campaign manager for Ontario Progressive Conservative candidates: in 1999 for former cabinet minister Brenda Elliott in the riding of Gueph-Wellington; and, In 1987 for Arthur Ward in the riding of Victoria-Halliburton.

Electoral record

References

External links
 Barry Devolin
 How'd They Vote?: Barry Devolin's voting history and quotes
 

1963 births
Conservative Party of Canada MPs
Living people
Members of the House of Commons of Canada from Ontario
People from Peterborough, Ontario
Carleton University alumni
Stony Brook University alumni
21st-century Canadian politicians